This list of the prehistoric life of Michigan contains the various prehistoric life-forms whose fossilized remains have been reported from within the US state of Michigan.

Precambrian
The Paleobiology Database records no known occurrences of Precambrian fossils in Michigan.

Paleozoic

Selected Paleozoic taxa of Michigan

 †Acidaspis
 †Actinoceras
 †Alethopteris
 †Alethopteris decurrens
  †Annularia
 †Annularia asteris
 †Annularia sphenophylloides
 †Athyris
 †Atrypa
 †Atrypa traversensis
 †Aulopora
 †Aulopora microbuccinata
 †Bellerophon
  †Calamites
 †Calamites carinatus
 †Calamites cistii
 †Calamites ramosus
 †Calamites schutzeiformis
 †Calamites suckowii
 †Calamites undulatus
 †Callixylon
 †Calymene
 †Camarotoechia
  †Ceraurus
 †Chonetes
 †Chonetes ensicosta
 †Chonetes hybus
 †Chonetes pachyactis
 †Climacograptus
 †Columnaria
 †Columnaria alveolata
 †Columnaria calicina
 †Columnaria stokesi
  †Cordaites
 †Cordaites borassifolius
 †Cordaites crassinervis
 †Cordaites michiganensis
 †Cordaites palmaeformis
 †Cordaites principalis
 †Cornulites
 †Cornulites corrugatus
 †Cornulites flexuosus
 †Cornulites sterlingensis – or unidentified comparable form
 †Cyclonema
 †Cyrtolites
 †Eldredgeops
 †Eldredgeops rana
 †Encrinurus
  †Endoceras
 †Erieopterus
 †Favosites
  †Flexicalymene
 †Flexicalymene croneisi
 †Flexicalymene magnipapilla – type locality for species
 †Flexicalymene meeki – or unidentified comparable form
 †Flexicalymene planilabra – type locality for species
 †Flexicalymene praelongicephala – type locality for species
 †Flexicalymene quadricapita – type locality for species
 †Flexicalymene senaria
 †Gilbertsocrinus
 †Girvanella
  †Grewingkia
 †Grewingkia canadensis
 †Hallopora
 †Hallopora subnodosa
 †Halysites
  †Hexagonaria
 †Hexagonaria pericarinata
 †Hindia
 †Holopea
 †Icriodus
 †Isotelus
 †Isotelus gigas
  †Lepidodendron
 †Lepidodendron aculeatum
 †Lepidodendron Brittsii
 †Lepidodendron dichotomum
 †Lepidodendron lanceolatum
 †Lepidodendron lycopodiodes
 †Lepidodendron obovatum
 †Lepidodendron obvatum
 †Lepidodendron ophiurioides
 †Lepidodendron vestitum
 †Lepidostrobus
 †Lingula
 †Maelonoceras
 †Meristella
  †Mucrospirifer
 †Mucrospirifer attenuatus
 †Mucrospirifer grabaui
 †Mucrospirifer latus
 †Mucrospirifer mucronatus
 †Mucrospirifer profundus
 †Mucrospirifer prolificus
 †Mucrospirifer thedfordensis
 †Murchisonia
 †Naticopsis
 †Naticopsis manitobensis
  †Neuropteris
 †Neuropteris caudata
 †Neuropteris dilitata
 †Neuropteris flexuosa
 †Neuropteris gigntea – tentative report
 †Neuropteris harrisi – or unidentified comparable form
 †Neuropteris heterophylla – or unidentified comparable form
 †Neuropteris obliqua
 †Neuropteris rarinervis
 †Neuropteris saginawensis
 †Neuropteris scheuchzeri
 †Neuropteris Schlehani
 †Neuropteris tenuifolia
 †Nodonema
 †Nowakia
 †Nuculoidea
  †Ogygites
 †Oncoceras
 †Orthoceras
 †Panenka
 †Paraspirifer
 †Pecopteris
 †Pentamerus
 †Phragmolites
 †Plaesiomys
  †Platyceras
 †Platyceras bucculentum
 †Platyceras carinatum
 †Platyceras rarispinum
  †Platystrophia
 †Platystrophia acutilirata
 †Platystrophia annieana
 †Platystrophia clarkesvillensis
 †Platystrophia clarksvillensis
 †Platystrophia cypha – or unidentified related form
 †Platystrophia moritura
 †Pleurodictyum
 †Polygnathus
  †Proetus
 †Proetus chambliensis
 †Samaropsis
 †Scenella – tentative report
 †Scutellum
 †Sigillaria
  †Sphenophyllum
 †Sphenophyllum bifurcatum
 †Sphenophyllum cuneifolium
 †Sphenophyllum emarginatum
 †Sphenophyllum majus
 †Sphenophyllum saxifragaefolium
 †Sphenopteris
 †Spirifer – report made of unidentified related form or using admittedly obsolete nomenclature
 †Spyroceras
  †Stethacanthus
 †Stigmaria
 †Stigmatella
  †Strophomena
 †Strophomena alpenensis
 †Strophomena costata
 †Strophomena crassa
 †Strophomena elongata
 †Strophomena erratica
 †Strophomena extenuata
 †Strophomena heteromys
 †Strophomena huronensis
 †Strophomena inaequiradiata
 †Strophomena levidensa
 †Strophomena neglecta
 †Strophomena nutans – or unidentified comparable form
 †Strophomena parvula
 †Strophomena pentagonia
 †Strophomena planumbona
 †Strophomena potterensis
 †Strophomena sulcata
 †Strophomena tenuicosta
 †Strophomena titan
  †Syringopora
 †Tentaculites
 †Tetradium
  †Triarthrus
 †Triarthrus eatoni

Mesozoic
The Paleobiology Database records no known occurrences of Mesozoic fossils in Michigan.

Cenozoic

 Abies
  †Abies balsamea
 Acer
 †Achnanthes
 †Achnanthes biasolettiana
 †Achnanthes exigua
  Alces
 †Alces alces
 Alnus
 †Ambrosia
 Amnicola
 †Amnicola integra
 †Amnicola limosa
 †Amphora
 †Amphora perpusilla
 Anodonta
 †Anodonta grandis – or unidentified comparable form
 Aplodinotus
 †Aplodinotus grunniens – or unidentified comparable form
 †Armiger
 †Armiger crista
 †Artemesia
 †Artemisia
 Aythya
 †Aythya affinis
 †Bakerilymnea
 †Bakerilymnea dalli
 Betula
 Bufo
  †Bufo americanus
 Candona
 †Candona caudata
 †Candona paraohioensis
 †Candona rawsoni
 Canis
 Carya
 Carychium
 †Carychium exiguum
 Castor
 †Castor canadensis
  †Castoroides
 †Castoroides ohioensis
 †Catinella
 †Catostomus
 †Catostomus commersoni
 †Cervalces
  †Cervalces scotti
 †Cionella
 †Cionella lubrica
 †Columella
 †Cymbella
 †Cymbella diluviana
 †Cytherissa
 †Cytherissa lacustris
 Dicrostonyx
 Discus
 †Discus cronkhitei
 Dryopteris
 Esox
  †Esox lucius
 Ferrissia
 †Ferrissia fragilis
 †Ferrissia paralellelus
 Fossaria
 †Fossaria decampi
  †Fragilaria
 †Fragilaria brevistriata
 †Fragilaria construens
 †Fragilaria lapponica
 †Fragillaria
 †Fragillaria pinnata
 †Fraxinus
 Grus
  †Grus americana
 Gryaulus
 †Gryaulus parvus
 Gyraulus
 †Gyraulus deflectus
 †Gyraulus parvus
 Helisoma
  †Helisoma anceps
 Hendersonia
 †Hendersonia occulta
 Juglans
 Larix
 †Larix laricina
 Lemmus
 †Lemmus trimucronatus – or unidentified comparable form
 Limnocythere
 †Limnocythere varia
 Lioplax
 †Lioplax suculosa – or unidentified comparable form
 Lycopodium
 Lymnaea
 †Lymnaea stagnalis
 †Mammut
 †Mammut americanum
 †Mammuthus
  †Mammuthus columbi
  †Mammuthus primigenius
 Meleagris
 †Meleagris gallopavo
 Microtus
 †Microtus pennsylvanicus
 †Microtus xanthognathus
 Mictomys
 †Mictomys borealis
 Mustela
 †Mustela richardsonii
 Myodes
  †Navicula
 †Navicula graciloides
 †Navicula minima
 †Navicula modica
 †Navicula subrotundata
 Odocoileus
  †Odocoileus virginianus
 Ondatra
 †Ondatra zibethicus
 Ostrya
 †Pediastrum
 Perca
 †Perca flavescens
 Peromyscus
 Physella
 †Physella integra
 Picea
 †Picea glauca
 †Picea mariana
 Pinus
 †Pinus banksiana
 †Pinus resinosa
  †Pinus strobus
 Pisidium
 †Pisidium compressum
 †Pisidium dubium
 †Pisidium idahoense
 †Pisidium milium
 †Pisidium nitidum
 †Pisidium variabile
 †Pisidium ventricosum
 †Planorbella
 †Planorbella campanulata
  †Platygonus
 †Platygonus compressus
 †Pomoxis – or unidentified comparable form
 Populus
 †Probythinella
 †Probythinella lacustris
 Pteridium
 Pungitius
 †Pungitius pungitius – or unidentified comparable form
 Quercus
 †Rana
 †Rana catesbeiana
 †Rana clamitans
  Rangifer
 Salix
 †Selaginella
 †Shepherdia
 †Shepherdia argentea
  Sorex
 †Sorex hoyi
 Sphaerium
 †Sphaerium striatinum
 Sphagnum
 Stagnicola
 †Stagnicola elodes
 †Thalictrum
 †Thuja
 Tilia
 †Tsuga
 Typha
 Ulmus
 Ursus
  †Ursus americanus
 Vallonia
 †Vallonia costata
 Valvata
 †Valvata sincera
 †Valvata tricarinata
 Vertigo
 †Vertigo alpestris
 †Vertigo elatior
 †Vertigo gouldi – or unidentified comparable form
 †Vertigo hannai
 †Vertigo modesta
 †Vertigo morsei
 †Vertigo ovata
 †Vertigo paradoxa
  Vitis
 Zapus
 †Zapus hudsonius – or unidentified comparable form
 Zonitoides
 †Zonitoides aboreas

References
 

Michigan
Michigan-related lists